Aminlu (also Romanized as Amīnlū) is a village in Mehmandust Rural District, Kuraim District, Nir County, Ardabil Province, northwestern Iran. At the 2006 census, its population was 150, in 32 families.

References 

Towns and villages in Nir County